The Carlsson's III Cabinet was the cabinet and Government of Sweden from 7 October 1994 to 22 March 1996.

The cabinet was a single-party minority government consisting the Social Democrats. The cabinet was led by Prime Minister Ingvar Carlsson who had led his party to victory in the 1994 general election. Ingvar Carlsson had previously been Prime Minister from 1986 until defeat in the 1991 general election.

The cabinet resigned on 22 March 1996 as Ingvar Carlsson retired from political life. The cabinet was succeeded by the cabinet of Göran Persson.

Ministers 

|}

External links
The Government and the Government Offices of Sweden

1994 establishments in Sweden
Cabinets of Sweden
Politics of Sweden
1996 disestablishments in Sweden
Cabinets established in 1994
Cabinets disestablished in 1996